Ret finger protein like 4A is a protein that in humans is encoded by the RFPL4A gene.

References

Further reading

External links 
 PDBe-KB provides an overview of all the structure information available in the PDB for Human Ret finger protein-like 4A